Nuphar is a genus of aquatic plants in the family Nymphaeaceae, with a temperate to subarctic Northern Hemisphere distribution. Common names include water-lily (Eurasian species; shared with many other genera in the same family), pond-lily, alligator-bonnet or bonnet lily, and spatterdock (North American species).

Taxonomy
 

The genus is closely related to Nymphaea. Nuphar differs in that its petals are much smaller than its 4–6 bright yellow-coloured sepals, whereas in Nymphaea, the petals are much larger than the sepals. The genera also differ in the maturation of their fruit; while maturing, Nuphar fruit remain above water level on their scapes, whereas fruit of Nymphaea sink below water level immediately after their flowers close, and there they mature. In both genera the leaves float and have a radial notch from the circumference to the point of attachment of the petiole. Depending on the species, the leaves of most species range from cordate to practically circular with the petiole attached in the middle, giving a peltate appearance. Some however, have modified versions of that leaf morphology; for example the leaves of N. sagittifolia have leaves of an elongated sagittate form.

The number of species in the genus is still under review.  Until the mid-20th century, some botanists treated the genus as just a single variable species (for which the European N. lutea has priority), while some other authorities accepted about a dozen more species on the basis of traditional taxonomic standards. Recent molecular work has shown that there are substantial differences between the Eurasian species (sect. Nuphar) and American species (sect. Astylus), except for North American N. microphylla which clusters with the Eurasian species. Molecular taxonomy has shown conclusively that recognition of so few species is out of the question, and forced an increased number of recognised species; some sources list about seventy. The Kew Gardens plant list includes over twenty accepted species, subspecies and varieties; it also has a similar number as yet unresolved, together with over twenty synonyms.

In 2017, the abundant fossilized seeds of a water lily, known as Notonuphar, were identified in the Eocene-aged La Meseta Formation of Seymour Island, Antarctica. The seed anatomy of Notonuphar closely resembles that of Nuphar, and for this reason, both are thought to be sister genera. Notonuphar is the first relative of Nuphar known to have inhabited Gondwana, and the wide geographic separation of both genera (Notonuphar inhabited Antarctica, while all extant and extinct Nuphar species are known from the Northern Hemisphere) supports the modern range of Nuphar being a relict distribution.

Species 
Nuphar Section Astylus
 Nuphar advena  (Aiton) W.T.Aiton –Spatterdock
 †Nuphar carlquistii DeVore, Taylor, & Pigg
 Nuphar polysepala Engelm. -Wocus
 Nuphar sagittifolia (Walter) Pursh
 Nuphar variegata Engelm. ex Durand – Variegated pond-lily

Nuphar Section Nuphar
 Nuphar japonica DC.
 Nuphar lutea (L.) Sm. – Yellow water-lily (type species)
 Nuphar microphylla 
 Nuphar pumila (Timm) DC. – Least water-lily

There also are several interspecific hybrids.

Etymology 
The etymology of the word is: medieval Latin nuphar, from medieval Latin nenuphar, thence from Arabic nīnūfar, thence from Persian nīlūfar, thence from Sanskrit nīlōtpala = blue lotus flower. For botanical gender, the name is treated as feminine.

Ecology 
N. lutea) or nutrient-poor waters (e.g. N. pumila).

Wetland soils are hypoxic, and this genus is known to be capable of temporary growth even in the absence of oxygen. Also there can be mass flow of oxygen-containing air, entering by means of the young leaves, passing through the rhizome, and exiting through the older leaves. Both of these physiological adaptations to flooding are considered typical of many wetland and aquatic plants.
 
Like many other vigorously growing members of the Nymphaeaceae, some species of Nuphar tend to cover the water surface completely, blocking out the light and thereby killing both submerged plants and less competitive surface-growing aquatics. They also produce alkaloids that have experimentally been shown to be allelopathic, though it is not clear how relevant the compounds may be in the wild.

Birds such as some species of ducks eat Nuphar seeds, and mammals such as beaver and coypu eat the roots of at least some species. Deer eat the flowers and young leaves, and the leaves are grazed by other animals.

Uses
Nuphar species are less generally useful as food or medicine than various species in the related water lily genus Nymphaea. Claims of the edibility or otherwise of the plant have varied wildly, which might in some cases have reflected errors and confusion, but in the light of the recognition of an increased number of species, the confusion might largely be because hitherto unrecognised species differ in their attributes.

Some species have been used by indigenous peoples. Young shoots and leaves sometimes were cooked but might be too bitter to eat. Whether the roots may be eaten, as is widely reported, is open to doubt; some sources claim that they are too bitter, too full of tannin, or simply too poisonous to eat unsoaked, except when treated for so long that they are not viable as a famine food. All sources however, agree that ripe seeds may be popped or variously used in cookery. They then are pleasant and nutritious, but require a lot of work to harvest and strip from the fruit capsule. To some extent this may be circumvented rotting the fruit under water for three weeks or more, after which removing the seeds is easier. The rotting material however, is very unpleasant to deal with. The flower petals are said to be used in making tea, but it is not clear whether that refers to the petals proper, or to the larger and more conspicuous sepals. The leaves of some species are large enough to be of use in wrapping food, for example in cooking.

Alkaloids in the genus include nupharolutine, nuphamine and nupharidine. The presence of such compounds could explain some of the medicinal uses

There has been growing interest in Nuphar alkaloids, their biological and pharmacological significance and their synthesis in recent decades. It has been speculated that these and other bioactive compounds might be related to some of the folk-medical applications of the plants.

Apart from pharmaceuticals, the leaves of Nuphar are reported to contain sufficient concentrations of tannin to have been widely used for tanning and dyeing leather, and also as a styptic for staunching bleeding. The roots of some species also contain sufficient tannin to have been used for tanning.

Gallery

See also

 List of plants known as lily

References

Nymphaeaceae
Freshwater plants
Nymphaeales genera